The China men's national basketball team (nickname Team Dragon) represents the People's Republic of China in international basketball tournaments. The national team is governed by the Chinese Basketball Association (CBA). Based on the number of tournament titles, China is considered a major basketball powerhouse in Asia and has by far the most successful basketball program on the continent.

History
China has traditionally been the basketball powerhouse in Asia and won the FIBA Asia Cup 14 out of 16 times between 1975 and 2005. At the 1984 Summer Olympics basketball tournament, the Chinese made their debut, starting a streak of nine qualifications in a row.

At the 2000 Olympics, Li Nan had a noteworthy performance as he scored 25 points on 6 three-pointers in a win against Italy. 

The Chinese failed to defend its championship at the 2007 FIBA Asia Cup. This was due to the automatic berth at the 2008 Beijing Olympics as the host nation, thus, China sent its "U23"Team to the 2007 tournament and finished 10th while its primary "A" team participated at the 2007 Stanković Cup which took place around the same time as the 2007 FIBA Asia Cup.

The team often struggled against top flight non-Asian competitors. However, in some cases, China refuted their critics and beat some the top European teams. In the 2004 Athens Olympics, China, coached by Del Harris, advanced to the final eight after a 67–66 win over defending world champion Serbia and Montenegro.

At the 2006 FIBA World Cup, China, coached by Lithuanian Jonas Kazlauskas also advanced to the second round from Group D, earning two victories against Senegal and Slovenia in five group play matches before falling in the round of sixteen to the eventual silver medalists Greece, 95–64; the team's overall placing by the end of the tournament from amongst the twenty-four competing sides was fifteenth.

In 2008, some questions surrounded whether the recently injured Yao Ming would still captain the squad. In mid-July, it was confirmed that he would still continue to be the captain.

At the 2008 Olympics in Beijing, Yao ended up as the third leading scorer of the competition with 20.7 points per game while also leading in rebounds with 9.3 per game. The game where Yao really made his mark was against New Zealand where he scored a tournament-high 39 points while also grabbing 13 rebounds, second most in a single game that year.

In the following years, the Chinese faced major struggles with injuries. In 2008, a then NBA prospect Xu Yong was forced to end his career at the age of 19 after being diagnosed with osteosarcoma. In December 2010, Yao was diagnosed with a stress fracture on his left ankle – the injury was related to the ankle sprain that he suffered earlier that year. Speculations arose whether China's basketball icon would ever be able to play again.

When Yao's retirement was finally announced in July 2011 it was considered a big blow to the national team, whose success had largely depended on him for many years. Yet, critics were optimistic that China would continue to improve on its international performances. In 2016, a new era of Chinese stars would begin to form, as NBA draftees in Zhou Qi and Wang Zhelin would gain considerable amounts of attention for their successes in China.

At the 2012 Olympics, it was Yi Jianlian who stepped up by averaging 14.8 points and 10.2 rebounds per game, highlighted by a 30-point, 12-rebound game against Spain to start the tournament.

In 2018, the team was invited to play at the 2018 NBA Summer League. They played a total of 5 games and won 1.

China hosted the 2019 FIBA Basketball World Cup which automatically qualified the team.

2023 World Cup qualification
In November 2021, China announced its 16-player squad for the 2023 FIBA Basketball World Cup qualification. 
The Guangdong Southern Tigers and the Liaoning Flying Leopards, the finalists of the 2020–21 Chinese Basketball Association season, contributed most as each team had four players called up.

Results

Olympic Games

FIBA World Cup

FIBA Asia Cup

FIBA Asia Challenge
 2012 FIBA Asia Cup – 4th
 2014 FIBA Asia Cup – 5th
 2016 FIBA Asia Challenge – 5th

Asian Games
 1974 Asian Games –  3rd
 1978 Asian Games –  1st
 1982 Asian Games –  2nd
 1986 Asian Games –  1st
 1990 Asian Games –  1st
 1994 Asian Games –  1st
 1998 Asian Games –  1st
 2002 Asian Games –  2nd
 2006 Asian Games –  1st
 2010 Asian Games –  1st
 2014 Asian Games – 5th
 2018 Asian Games –  1st

East Asian Basketball Championship
 2009 East Asian Basketball Championship –  3rd
 2011 East Asian Basketball Championship –  3rd
 2013 East Asian Basketball Championship –  2nd
 2017 East Asian Basketball Championship – 4th

East Asian Games
 1993 East Asian Games –  1st
 1997 East Asian Games –  3rd
 2001 East Asian Games –  1st
 2005 East Asian Games –  3rd
 2009 East Asian Games – 4th
 2013 East Asian Games –  2nd

Team

Current roster
Roster for the 2020 FIBA Men's Olympic Qualifying Tournaments.

Depth chart

Past rosters

1936 Summer Olympics: 15th among 21 teams

Shen Yi-Tung, Tsai Yen-Hung, Wang Hung-Pin, Wang Shi-Hsuan, Wang Yu-Tseng, Wong Nan-Chen, Liu Bao-Cheng, Liu Yun-Chang, Mou Tso-Yun, Li Shao-Tang, Yu Sai-Chang

1948 Summer Olympics: 18th among 23 teams

Edward Lee, Lee Tsun-Tung, Woo Cheng-Chang, Wee Tian-Siak, Pao Sung-Yuan, Chia Chung-Chang, Chua Bon-Hua, Kya Is-Kyun, Yu Sai-Chang, Jose Yee

1978 FIBA World Championship: 11th among 14 teams

Wang Zongxing, Chen Kai, Kuang Lubin, Xing Weining, Wang Deli, Huang Pinjie, Mu Tiezhu, Ji Zhaoguang, Zhang Weiping, Liu Jizeng, Zhang Mingwei, He Juhua (Coach: Qian Chenghai)

1982 FIBA World Championship: 12th among 13 teams

Wang Zongxing, Ji Zhaoguang, Xu Xiaoliang, Kuang Lubin, Sun Fengwu, Wang Libin, Huang Yunlong, Feng Wei, Li Qiuping, Li Yaguang, Han Pengshan, Lu Jinqing (Coach: Qian Chenghai)

1984 Summer Olympics: 10th among 12 teams

Kuang Lubin, Ji Zhaoguang, Wang Libin, Liu Jianli, Hu Zhangbao, Lu Jinqing, Sun Fengwu, Zhang Bin, Huang Yunlong, Guo Yonglin, Wang Haibo, Li Yaguang (Coach: Qian Chenghai)

1986 FIBA World Championship: 9th among 24 teams

Wang Libin, Zhang Yongjun, Li Yaguang, Wang Fei, Huang Yunlong, Xu Xiaoliang, Zhang Bin, Li Feng, Sun Fengwu, Sha Guoli, Song Tao, Gong Luming (Coach: Qian Chenghai)

1988 Summer Olympics: 11th among 12 teams

Li Yaguang, Wang Fei, Wang Libin, Zhang Yongjun, Xu Xiaoliang, Zhang Bin, Huang Yunlong, Sun Fengwu, Zhang Xuelei, Chen Chijef, Song Ligang, Gong Luming, Sha Guoli (Coach: Qian Chenghai)

1990 FIBA World Championship: 14th among 16 teams

Li Chunjiang, Wang Fei, Sun Fengwu, Zhang Yongjun, Zhang Bin, Shan Tao, Song Ligang, Ma Jian, Gong Xiaobin, Zhang Degui, Wang Zhidan, Gong Luming (Coach: Wang Zhangyou)

1992 Summer Olympics: 12th among 12 teams

Hu Weidong, Li Chunjiang, Zhang Yongjun, Sun Fengwu, Ma Jian, Shan Tao, Wang Zhidan, Wu Qinglong, Gong Xiaobin, Sun Jun, Song Ligang, Adiljan (Coach: Jiang Xingquan)

1994 FIBA World Championship: 8th among 16 teams

Hu Weidong, Sun Jun, Shan Tao, Gong Xiaobin, Liu Yudong, Zhang Jinsong, Liu Daqing, Adiljan, Zheng Wu, Ji Minshang, Wu Naiqun, Wu Qinglong (Coach: Jiang Xingquan)

1996 Summer Olympics: 8th among 12 teams

Mengke Bateer, Wang Zhizhi, Hu Weidong, Liu Yudong, Li Nan, Shan Tao, Sun Jun, Gong Xiaobin, Wu Qinglong, Li Xiaoyong, Zheng Wu, Wu Naiqun (Coach: Gong Luming)

2000 Summer Olympics: 10th among 12 teams

Yao Ming, Mengke Bateer, Wang Zhizhi, Hu Weidong, Sun Jun, Li Nan, Guo Shiqiang, Liu Yudong, Zheng Wu, Zhang Jinsong, Li Qun, Li Xiaoyong (Coach: Jiang Xingquan)

2002 FIBA World Championship: 12th among 16 teams

Yao Ming, Mengke Bateer, Liu Wei, Li Nan, Hu Weidong, Guo Shiqiang, Zhang Cheng, Chen Ke, Gong Xiaobin, Liu Yudong, Du Feng, Zhu Fangyu (Coach: Wang Fei)

2004 Summer Olympics: 8th among 12 teams

Yao Ming, Yi Jianlian, Liu Wei, Mengke Bateer, Li Nan, Guo Shiqiang, Du Feng, Chen Ke, Zhang Yunsong, Zhu Fangyu, Zhang Jinsong, Mo Ke (Coach: Del Harris)

2006 FIBA World Championship: 15th among 24 teams

Yao Ming, Wang Zhizhi, Yi Jianlian, Liu Wei, Du Feng, Wang Shipeng, Mo Ke, Zhang Songtao, Chen Jianghua, Zhang Qingpeng, Zhu Fangyu, Sun Yue (Coach: Jonas Kazlauskas)

2008 Summer Olympics: 8th among 12 teams

Yao Ming, Wang Zhizhi, Yi Jianlian, Liu Wei, Du Feng, Wang Shipeng, Wang Lei, Li Nan, Chen Jianghua, Zhang Qingpeng, Zhu Fangyu, Sun Yue (Coach: Jonas Kazlauskas)

2014 Asian Games: 5th among 16 teams

2016 Summer Olympics: 12th among 12 teams

2016 FIBA Asia Challenge: 5th among 12 teams

List of head coaches

Kit

Manufacturer
2010–15: Nike - present

Sponsor
2010: China Mobile, UPS
2011, 2013–15: TCL

See also

China national under-19 basketball team
China national under-17 basketball team
China national 3x3 team
China women's national basketball team
Chinese Basketball Association
Chinese Basketball Association (organisation)
Chinese Taipei men's national basketball team
National Basketball League
Women's Chinese Basketball Association
Sport in China

References

External links

China at FIBA site
China National Team - Men at Asia-basket.com
China Basketball Records at FIBA Archive

 
Men's national basketball teams
1974 establishments in China